Arikathota is a village in Ramabhadrapuram mandal, Vizianagaram district, Andhra Pradesh, India.

References 

Villages in Vizianagaram district